Manava was the son and successor to the previous king of Gauda, Shashanka. He was the last recorded ruler of the dynasty and was likely deposed by Harshavardhana (Emperor of Northern India) or Bhaskaravarman (King of Kamarupa). He ruled as king for 8 months 5 days during 625-626 CE.

See also
List of rulers of Bengal

References

Rulers of Bengal
7th-century monarchs in Asia